Zamir Vjerdha (born 9 March 1997) is an Albanian football player who plays for Veleçiku Koplik in the Albanian First Division.

References

1997 births
Living people
Footballers from Shkodër
Albanian footballers
Association football goalkeepers
KF Vllaznia Shkodër players
KS Veleçiku Koplik players
Kategoria Superiore players
Kategoria e Parë players